The 2022 Supercopa Internacional was the 1st edition of the Supercopa Internacional, an international version of the Supercopa Argentina, the annual football match contested by the winners of the Primera División and Copa Argentina competitions.

The competition was held in Abu Dhabi, United Arab Emirates, after an agreement between the AFA and the local Sports Council which includes four editions of the competition (up to 2026).

The match was played between Boca Juniors (winners of 2022 Primera División) and Racing Club de Avellaneda (winners of 2022 Trofeo de Campeones) on 20 January 2023 at Hazza bin Zayed Stadium.

Racing defeated Boca Juniors 2–1 to win their first title.

Qualified teams 
 Note: Bold indicates winners

Match

Details

Statistics

References 

2022 in Argentine football
2022
Boca Juniors matches
Racing Club matches